Our Lady of Mercy High School or Our Lady of Mercy Catholic High School may refer to:

 Our Lady of Mercy Catholic High School (Georgia), Fayetteville, Georgia
 Our Lady of Mercy High School, former name of Our Lady of Mercy School for Young Women, Brighton, Monroe County, New York
 Our Lady of Mercy High School (Ohio), a former school in Cincinnati, Ohio
 Our Lady of Mercy Catholic High School (Micronesia), Federated States of Micronesia

See also
Mercy High School (disambiguation)
Our Lady of Mercy Academy (disambiguation)